is a song recorded by Japanese idol girl group Nogizaka46. It was released as the group's thirty-first single on December 7, 2022, through N46Div. and Sony Music Records. First-generation member Asuka Saitō served as her eighth center position of the performance since the latest 2019 single "Sing Out!" and participated as her last single from the group. Its accompanying music video premiered ahead on November 19. Commercially, "Koko ni wa Nai Mono" reached number one on the Oricon Singles Chart and number two on the Billboard Japan Hot 100, and was certified million by Recording Industry Association of Japan (RIAJ).

Background and release

On October 31, 2022, at their show Nogizaka Under Construction, Nogizaka46 announced their thirty-first single, scheduled for release on December 7 on four limited CD+Blu-ray, a regular CD, and special digital extended play. On November 4, Asuka Saitō, a first-generation member, announced her graduation (leaving) from the group via her official blog, stated that she plans to end up her group's activities in December 2022 and hold her graduation concert next year. The next day, she and the group held live streaming via the YouTube channel Nogizaka Streaming Now at 19:30 JST, revealed the song title "Koko ni wa Nai Mono", and senbatsu members, including Saitō who is in charge of the center position. Front and back cover artworks for all physical editions of "Koko ni wa Nai Mono", taken by Toshiaki Kitaoka, was revealed on November 9, expressing multiple exposure that superimposes the members and various events related to Saitō. All Blu-rays included the group's performances at Midsummer National Tour 2022, which was held between August 29 and 31 at Meiji Jingu Stadium, Tokyo.

Music video

An accompanying music video for "Koko ni wa Nai Mono" was uploaded via Nogizaka46's official YouTube channel on November 19, 2022. It was directed by Keiji Kobayashi and shot from late October to early November. The choreography scene was filmed on the rooftop of building in Roppongi Hills, while Saitō's solo part was on Tokyo Metro Ginza Line Shibuya Station's platform. The story depicts Saitō, who is an employee at a clothes shop, chasing her dream of becoming a designer, even though she felt that it was impossible.

B-sides

The music video for under members' track "Warui Seibun", which served Reno Nakamura as the center position, was uploaded on November 22. It was directed by Atsunori Tōshi, and shot at Tipstar Dome, a velodrome in Chiba. The music video expresses the theme of chasing two ingredients; a bad one and a gentle one. The next is fifth-generation "17 Funkan", which the center position is Sakura Kawasaki, released on December 1. Shot at a school in Ibaraki, the music video is directed by Mitsunori Yokobori, showing the members trying to restart the clock that has stopped at 5:17 with gears containing their own thoughts. Saitō's solo track "Kore kara" music video was uploaded on December 7, directed by Santa Yamagishi. It shows Saitō flashbacking her past, present, and future. The music video of "Ato no Matsuri", self-made by the members who sing the song, was released on December 10.

Commercial performance

On the release day, Soundscan Japan reported that the CD single "Koko ni wa Nai Mono" sold over 643,390 copies on its flying get day, becoming their highest single physical sales since COVID-19 pandemic, surpassed 542,558 copies of the previous single "Suki to Iu no wa Rock da ze!". "Koko ni wa Nai Mono" entered Billboard Japan Hot 100 at number two in the chart issue dated December 14, 2022, behind only Official Hige Dandism's "Subtitle". In its first week, the single earned 830,384 CD sales, debuting atop the Top Singles Sales chart; and 11,486 downloads, peaked at number four on the Download Songs.

"Koko ni wa Nai Mono" debuted at number one Oricon Singles Chart in the chart issue dated December 19, 2022, becoming the group's thirty consecutive number-one single since their 2012 single "Oide Shampoo", and the second most consecutive number-one singles in Japan, behind only AKB48 with 47 singles at that time. The single sold 654,000 copies in its first week, making the group monopolizing the entire top three the biggest single sales week by a female act in 2022–"Koko ni wa Nai Mono", "Suki to Iu no wa Rock da ze!" (577,000 copies), and "Actually... (463,000 copies). "Koko ni wa Nai Mono" was certified million for physical shipments by Recording Industry Association of Japan (RIAJ) on February 10; the first in three years since the 25th single "Shiawase no Hogoshoku".

Live performances

On November 4, 2022, Nogizaka46 gave the debut performance of "Koko ni wa Nai Mono" through their YouTube channel Nogizaka Streaming Now. In the beginning, Saitō, wearing the long white dress, appeared alone on the rooftop of Tokyo Solamachi to greet fans. Then, the other members, who also wore the same as Saitō, appeared later. Afterwards, the group performed the song at several Japanese music shows, such as 2022 Best Hits Kayosai on November 11, TV Tokyo Festival 2022 Winter on November 23, Venue101 on November 26, Best Artist 2022 on December 3, as a medley with their 2018 single "Synchronicity", 2022 FNS Music Festival on December 7, alongside "Jin Jin Jingle Bell" collaborated with Chisato Moritaka, CDTV Live! Live! Christmas 4-Hour Special on December 17, the six-hour special Music Station Ultra Super Live 2022 on December 23, and Happyō! Kotoshi Ichiban Kiita Uta: Annual Music Award 2022, along with their 17th single "Influencer", on December 28.

Participating members

The eighteen members of Nogizaka46 were selected to be participating members (senbatsu) for "Koko ni wa Nai Mono", and eleven members for fukujin (first and second-row members). The first-generation member Asuka Saitō was chosen as a center position due to her graduation from the group. The fourth-generation Runa Hayashi was selected for senbatsu for the first time, while the third-generation Tamami Sakaguchi since 2019 single "Sing Out!", and the fourth-generation Seira Hayakawa since 2022 single "Actually...". 

 Third row: Yuna Shibata, Renka Iwamoto, Tamami Sakaguchi, Ayame Tsutsui, Seira Hayakawa, Runa Hayashi, Nao Yumiki, Rei Seimiya,
 Second row: Mayu Tamura, Shiori Kubo, Minami Umezawa, Manatsu Akimoto, Ayane Suzuki, Saya Kanagawa
 First row: Haruka Kaki, Sakura Endō, Asuka Saitō , Mizuki Yamashita, Yūki Yoda

Accolades

Track listing

All lyrics are written by Yasushi Akimoto, except the off-vocal tracks.

Charts

Weekly charts

Monthly charts

Year-end charts

Certifications

Release history

See also
 List of Oricon number-one singles of 2022

References

2022 singles
2022 songs
Japanese-language songs
Nogizaka46 songs
Oricon Weekly number-one singles
Songs with lyrics by Yasushi Akimoto
Sony Music Entertainment Japan singles